The 1990 NCAA Division III men's basketball tournament was the 16th annual single-elimination tournament to determine the national champions of National Collegiate Athletic Association (NCAA) men's Division III collegiate basketball in the United States.

Held during March 1990, the field included forty teams. The championship rounds were again contested in Springfield, Ohio.

Rochester defeated DePauw, 43–42, to clinch their first NCAA Division III national title.

Championship Rounds
Site: Springfield, Ohio

See also
1990 NCAA Division I men's basketball tournament
1990 NCAA Division II men's basketball tournament
1990 NCAA Division III women's basketball tournament
1990 NAIA Division I men's basketball tournament

References

NCAA Division III men's basketball tournament
NCAA Men's Division III Basketball
Ncaa Tournament
NCAA Division III basketball tournament